First Universalist Church or First Universalist Chapel may refer to:

United States 
(by state then city)
 First Universalist Church (Atlanta, Georgia)
 First Universalist Church (Elgin, Illinois), listed on the National Register of Historic Places (NRHP) in Kane County
 First Universalist Church (Auburn, Maine), NRHP-listed in Androscoggin County
 First Universalist Church (Provincetown, Massachusetts), NRHP-listed in Barnstable County
 First Universalist Church (Salem, Massachusetts), NRHP-listed in Essex County
 First Universalist Church (Somerville, Massachusetts), NRHP-listed in Middlesex County
 First Universalist Church (Kingston, New Hampshire), NRHP-listed in Rockingham County
 First Universalist Chapel (Lempster, New Hampshire), NRHP-listed in Sullivan County
 First Universalist Church (Rochester, New York), NRHP-listed in Monroe County
 First Universalist Church (Cincinnati, Ohio), NRHP-listed in Hamilton County
 First Universalist Church (Providence, Rhode Island), NRHP-listed in Providence County
 First Universalist Church (Wausau, Wisconsin), NRHP-listed in Marathon County